St. Regis Hotels & Resorts is a luxury hotel chain owned and managed by Marriott International.

History
In 1904, John Jacob Astor built the St. Regis New York as a sister property to his part-owned Waldorf-Astoria Hotel. Exhibiting luxury and technological advance, each room had its own telephone. Ownership changes, a new wing, and restorations occurred over the following decades. In 1966, Sheraton Hotels purchased the property. After an extensive restoration in 1991, the hotel became the flagship for the Sheraton premier hotels rebranded as the ITT Sheraton Luxury Collection.

In 1998, Starwood acquired the Sheraton brand, and created a new St. Regis brand.
In September 2016, Marriott gained the St. Regis chain as part of its acquisition of Starwood. The brand name cannot be used in the lower mainland of British Columbia, because the name is legally owned by the independent St. Regis Hotel, Vancouver, built in 1913.

Accommodations

Locations
There are over 60 St. Regis-branded hotels around the world with over 10,000 rooms. Some of the better-known properties include:
 The St. Regis Bal Harbour
 The St. Regis Chicago
 The St. Regis Mexico City
 The St. Regis New York
 The St. Regis Toronto
 The St. Regis Washington, D.C.
 The St. Regis Zhuhai
 The St. Regis HongKong

The Tokenization of The St. Regis Aspen 
In January 2018, SolidBlock created a smart contract and digitized platform for the tokenization of The St. Regis Aspen, which became the first private single asset real estate investment trust (REIT) in the US to issue a Security Token Offering and traded on the blockchain. Through an intensive campaign, $18 million was raised - nearly one-fifth of the equity deal sold through digital tokens to investors worldwide.

References

External links

 
 

 
Hotels established in 1904
Marriott International brands